The knockout stage of the 2015 Rugby World Cup began on 17 October with two quarter-finals and concluded on 31 October with the final at Twickenham Stadium in London with all matches played over the course of three consecutive weekends.

Qualified teams
Australia went unbeaten to finish in first place in Pool A, with Wales in second place. In Pool B, South Africa finished top despite losing their opening match against Japan, ahead of Scotland in second place. New Zealand also went unbeaten as winners of Pool C, with Argentina in second. Pool D was topped by Northern Hemisphere teams, with Ireland coming first and France in second.

Bracket

Quarter-finals

South Africa vs Wales

New Zealand vs France

Notes:
 This was the largest winning margin in a Rugby World Cup knockout stage match, surpassing the 43-point winning margin New Zealand set against Wales in 1987.	
 The nine tries scored by New Zealand is the most scored by one team in a Rugby World Cup knockout stage match.	
 With his hat-trick of tries in this match, Julian Savea equalled Jonah Lomu and Bryan Habana's single-tournament record of eight tries.

Ireland vs Argentina

Notes:
 This was Argentina's first victory over Ireland since their 30–15 victory in the 2007 Rugby World Cup.	
 This was Argentina's largest winning margin over Ireland, surpassing the 16-point margin recorded in June 2007.

Australia vs Scotland

Notes:
 Fraser Brown and Tim Swinson were named to start, but after Ross Ford and Jonny Gray's three-match bans were overturned, they were named in the team minutes before kick off.
 Matt Giteau and Stephen Moore became the seventh and eighth Australian players to earn 100 test caps.
 The 34 points scored by Scotland were the most they had ever scored against Australia.	
After the match, World Rugby issued a statement over referee Craig Joubert's controversial decision to award a late penalty to Australia. The report concluded that while Joubert could not have consulted TMO at the time, his decision was in fact wrong, as the replay showed that Australia's Nick Phipps had played the ball before Scotland's Jon Welsh received it. The correct call should have been a scrum awarded to Australia for the original knock-on.

Semi-finals
This was the first Rugby World Cup where no Northern Hemisphere team reached the semi-finals. The semi-final line-up consisted of the four Rugby Championship teams: New Zealand, South Africa, Argentina and Australia. Both matches were played at Twickenham which was also used for the same stage back in the 1999 Rugby World Cup.

South Africa vs New Zealand

Notes:
New Zealand became the first team to reach four Rugby World Cup finals, having previously played in the 1987, 1995, and 2011 finals.
 New Zealand's Sonny Bill Williams, Jerome Kaino and Sam Whitelock played in a record 13 consecutive World Cup wins.

Argentina vs Australia

Notes:
 Michael Hooper, just 3 years and 140 days since his debut, became the fastest player ever to earn his 50th test cap, surpassing Australia's Al Baxter's record of 4 years and 44 days, and became the youngest Australian to achieve the 50-test landmark.
 James Slipper became Australia's most capped prop, surpassing both Ben Alexander's and Benn Robinson's record of 72 caps.
 Australia became the second team, after New Zealand, to reach four Rugby World Cup finals, having previously played in the 1991, 1999, and 2003 finals.

Bronze Final: South Africa vs Argentina

Notes:
 Pat Lambie earned his 50th test cap for South Africa.

Final: New Zealand vs Australia

Notes:
 New Zealand became the first team to retain the Rugby World Cup title, and win a third World Cup title.	
 This was the first time New Zealand won the World Cup on foreign soil.
 The aggregate 51 points scored was the most ever in a Rugby World Cup final.
 Ben Smith became the first player to receive a yellow card in a Rugby World Cup final.
 New Zealand's Sonny Bill Williams, Jerome Kaino and Sam Whitelock played in a record 14th consecutive World Cup wins.
 Fourteen New Zealand players joined five Australians and one South African as winners of multiple Rugby World Cups. McCaw became the first player to captain two World Cup winners.

References

Knockout
World Cup
World Cup
World Cup
World Cup
Knockout
Knockout
World Cup
World Cup